MS BASIC for Macintosh was a dialect of Microsoft BASIC for Macintosh. It was one of the first Microsoft BASIC variants to have optional line numbering, predating QuickBASIC. It was provided in two versions, one with standard binary floating point and another with decimal arithmetic.

References

BASIC programming language
Discontinued BASICs
Classic Mac OS programming tools
Microsoft programming languages
1983 software